Senecio murinus is a plant species of the genus Senecio and family Asteraceae.

References

External links

murinus
Flora of Chile